FHFS may refer to:
 FHFS (file server)
 Dihydrofolate synthase, an enzyme

See also 
 FHF (disambiguation)